Hubie Oliver (born November 12, 1957, in Elyria, Ohio) is a former American football running back in the National Football League. He was drafted by the Philadelphia Eagles in the 10th round of the 1981 NFL Draft. He played college football at Arizona.

Oliver also played for the Indianapolis Colts and Houston Oilers.

1957 births
Living people
American football fullbacks
Arizona Wildcats football players
Philadelphia Eagles players
Indianapolis Colts players
Houston Oilers players
Players of American football from Ohio
African-American players of American football
21st-century African-American people
20th-century African-American sportspeople